Ale Rudbar (also Romanized as Ale Rūdbār) is a village in Esbu Kola Rural District, in the Central District of Babol County, Mazandaran Province, Iran. In 2006, its population was 1,608, in 390 families.

References 

Populated places in Babol County